OFB, short for Original Farm Boys, is a British hip hop collective based in Broadwater Farm, London. OFB is one of the most prominent UK drill groups.

History 
Headie One (formerly Headz) and RV (formerly Young RV) are among the most prominent members of the group. They were both originally rappers in Star Gang, a road rap group from the 2000s and an offshoot group from the Tottenham Mandem gang. RV and Headie One have frequently collaborated with each other, including co-releasing the mixtapes Sticks & Stones (2016) and Drillers x Trappers (2017). In February 2018, Headie One released his solo mixtape, The One. The mixtape included the song "Know Better" featuring RV, which became an "underground hit". This was followed by another solo mixtape, The One Two, in June 2018, which entered the UK Albums Chart at number 32.

Bandokay, Double Lz and SJ are the younger members within OFB, initially using the name Y.OFB (Young OFB) signifying their status as younger members of the group, before later dropping the "Y." and co-opting the "OFB" prefix older members of the group used. OFB rapper Bandokay, whose real name is Kemani Duggan, is the son of Mark Duggan, the man whose death by police shooting led to the 2011 England riots. Bandokay credited music for keeping him away from crime, and stated his desire to be away from police as a motivator:

Bandokay credited fellow OFB rapper Headie One as a major influence, as well as UK drill group 67 and American rapper Lil Durk. Double Lz noted Giggs, American rapper Quando Rondo, and the Chicago drill scene in general as influences.

In January 2019, Headie One released "18Hunna", featuring Dave, which entered the UK chart at number 6 - the highest a drill artist, at the time, had ever charted, and has gained over 15 million views on YouTube, as of February 2022. Following RV's release from prison, on 22 March 2019, RV and Headie One released a third mixtape called Drillers x Trappers II. It entered the UK Albums Chart at number 21. "Match Day", the first single from the mixtape, entered the Singles Chart at number 86.

In 2019, the OFB released their first collective mixtape titled Frontstreet, named after a road in Broadwater Farm that locals call "Front Street". Dazed Digital called the mixtape "one of the best British debuts of the decade". In 2019, following the release of OFB rapper SJ's "Youngest In Charge", which has gained over 27 million views on YouTube as of February 2022, it was revealed SJ was currently facing trial for a murder charge and had been arrested; while waiting for his trial, SJ was offered a £150k deal with an unknown record label. SJ was later convicted and sentenced to life with a minimum of 21 years. His sentence would later be reduced to a minimum of 19 years in 2021, which was announced via his Instagram account. 
Like many other drill groups, OFB has had its songs taken down by YouTube at the request of the Metropolitan Police. In 2019, OFB's own YouTube channel was also taken down, before later being reinstated the next day. Bandokay stated they were trying to clean up their music in order to avoid takedowns.

Current members 
The list below includes confirmed members of OFB
 Abra Cadabra
 Akz
 Bandokay (Kemani Duggan)
 Blitty
 Bradz
 Dee One (formerly D1)
 Delsa
 Dezzie
 Double Lz (Andre Deer)
 Dsavv
 DZ
 Headie One (Irving Ampofo Adjei; formerly Headz)
 Izzpot
 Kash One7 (or simply Kash)
 Kush
 Lowkey OFB
 Munie
 Rv (Jordan Townsend; formerly Young RV)
 SJ (Jayden O'Neill-Crichlow)
 Skat
 YF
 ZeZe
 Zilla

Former members 
 JS
 Tuggzy

Legal issues
In 2020, SJ, alongside four others (Sheareem Cookhorn, Tyrell "Trills" Graham, Shane "Sneakz" Lyons and Ojay "O'Sav" Hamilton), was given a life sentence with a minimum of 21 years for the murder of Kamali Gabbidon-Lynck in Wood Green. The group was said to be linked to the NPK. In reaction to the sentence, Carl Stanbury, an electrician and alleged stepfather of Sneakz, jumped from the public gallery; he was sentenced to 7 months in jail for doing so. SJ’s sentence was later reduced to a minimum of 19 years in 2021, which was announced via his Instagram account. Before his sentence, he received a reprimand for the possession of a bladed article at age 14.

In 2022, Bandokay and Double Lz were charged with violent disorder following a 2021 incident at a Selfridges store, in which two people were stabbed.

Discography

Mixtapes

Singles

As lead artist

As featured artist

Awards and nominations

References 

Hip hop collectives
English hip hop groups
UK drill musicians
Rappers from London
Tottenham